Leptodactylus longirostris is a species of frog in the family Leptodactylidae. Its local name is sapito silbador carilargo ("long-faced whistling toadlet").

It is found in Brazil, Colombia, French Guiana, Guyana, Suriname, and Venezuela. Its natural habitats are subtropical or tropical moist lowland forests, subtropical or tropical seasonally wet or flooded lowland grassland, rivers, freshwater marshes, intermittent freshwater marshes, pastureland, and rural gardens. It is not considered threatened by the IUCN.

References 

longirostris
Amphibians of Brazil
Amphibians of Colombia
Amphibians of French Guiana
Amphibians of Guyana
Amphibians of Suriname
Amphibians of Venezuela
Amphibians described in 1882
Taxonomy articles created by Polbot